HDMS Birkholm (A541) is the first of six Holm-class Mk.I standard research vessels built for the Royal Danish Navy. She was launched on 10 December 2005 and commissioned on 27 January 2006. She is unarmed, carries a crew of 3 with facilities for 10 persons. The Holm-class can be used in a surveying, training or minesweeping role, with an open position aft which can hold various equipment such as a crane.

References

Survey ships of the Royal Danish Navy
2005 ships